The De La Brooke Tobacco Barn is a historic tobacco barn in rural northern St. Mary's County, Maryland. The barn measures 36 feet by 42 feet 6 inches, and is oriented with its gable ends southeast and northwest. Built about 1815 (or possibly somewhat earlier), it is a well-preserved example of a period tobacco drying barn, which also utilizes a unique internal system of tier poles inside. It is part of the Cremona Farm estate.

The barn was listed on the National Register of Historic Places in 2015.

See also
National Register of Historic Places listings in St. Mary's County, Maryland

References

Buildings and structures in St. Mary's County, Maryland
Barns on the National Register of Historic Places in Maryland
Barns in Maryland
National Register of Historic Places in St. Mary's County, Maryland
Tobacco barns